Sonnet 39 is one of 154 sonnets written by the English playwright and poet William Shakespeare. It is a member of the Fair Youth sequence, in which the poet expresses his love towards a young man.

Structure
Sonnet 39 is an English or Shakespearean sonnet, composed of three quatrains and a final rhyming couplet for a total of fourteen lines. It follows the rhyme scheme ABAB CDCD EFEF GG. It is written in iambic pentameter, a metre based on five pairs of syllables accented weak/strong. The second line is one example of a line of regular iambic pentameter:

×   /   ×    /    ×    /  ×    /  ×   / 
O, how thy worth with manners may I sing
/ = ictus, a metrically strong syllabic position. × = nonictus.

The fifth line can be scanned with an initial reversal:

/ ×   ×    /    x  /   × / ×   / 
Even for this, let us divided live, (39.5)

Themes
Sonnet 39 continues with sonnets 35–37 the theme of the poet and the young man being united in love as one person and the suggestion of being separated (twain):  “How can I praise you properly when we are so combined?  I would be praising, in a sense, myself.”   The poet suggests that a separation will help him praise the young man while thinking of his admirable aspects in absence.  Beginning with line 9 the poet addresses not the youth, but “absence”: “Oh absence, you would be torment, except that you provide a pleasant opportunity to think on love, and, absence, you teach one to be not solitary but to be two, by praising the young man where I am, though he continues to be elsewhere (hence).”

Notes

Further reading

External links
Analysis

British poems
Sonnets by William Shakespeare